The 1924 Washington Senators won 92 games, lost 62, and finished in first place in the American League. Fueled by the excitement of winning their first AL pennant, the Senators won the World Series in dramatic fashion, a 12-inning Game Seven victory.

Regular season

The Senators' offense was led by future Hall of Famer Goose Goslin, who was one of the youngest players on the team. He drove in a league-leading 129 runs. Walter Johnson had another outstanding year, winning the American League pitching Triple Crown and being voted Most Valuable Player. He anchored a staff that allowed the fewest runs in the league. Reliever Firpo Marberry paced the circuit in saves and games pitched. Manager Bucky Harris, who was also the team's starting second baseman, was the highest paid player on the team, earning $9,000.

Season standings

Record vs. opponents

Roster

Attendance
The Senators drew 584,310 fans to their 77 home games at Griffith Stadium, good for 4th place among the 8 American League teams and an average of 7,588 per game.

Player stats

Batting

Starters by position
Note: Pos = Position; G = Games played; AB = At bats; H = Hits; Avg. = Batting average; HR = Home runs; RBI = Runs batted in

Other batters
Note: G = Games played; AB = At bats; H = Hits; Avg. = Batting average; HR = Home runs; RBI = Runs batted in

Pitching

Starting pitchers
Note: G = Games pitched; IP = Innings pitched; W = Wins; L = Losses; ERA = Earned run average; SO = Strikeouts

Other pitchers 
Note: G = Games pitched; IP = Innings pitched; W = Wins; L = Losses; ERA = Earned run average; SO = Strikeouts

Relief pitchers
Note: G = Games pitched; W = Wins; L = Losses; SV = Saves; ERA = Earned run average; SO = Strikeouts

Awards and honors

League top five finishers
Goose Goslin
 AL leader in RBI (129)
 #2 in AL in triples (17)

Walter Johnson
 MLB leader in shutouts (6)
 AL leader in wins (23)
 AL leader in ERA (2.72)
 AL leader in strikeouts (158)

Firpo Marberry
 MLB leader in saves (15)

Sam Rice
 #3 in AL in stolen bases (24)
 #4 in AL in triples (14)

Tom Zachary
 #2 in AL in ERA (2.75)

Postseason

The Senators finally made it into the postseason after many years of being the laughingstock of the American League. Behind ace pitcher Walter Johnson, they won the deciding Game Seven 4-3 in extra innings. The team returned to the World Series the next year and also in 1933, losing both, their last Series while playing in Washington. It wasn’t until 2019 that an MLB team based in the District of Columbia won another World Series.

References

External links
1924 Washington Senators at Baseball-Reference
1924 Washington Senators at Baseball Almanac

Minnesota Twins seasons
Washington Senators season
American League champion seasons
World Series champion seasons
Washing